Shane Tonkin (born 12 February 1971 in Perth, Western Australia) is an Australian baseball pitcher. He represented Australia at the 1996 Summer Olympics. He played for Perth Heat in the Australian Baseball League and also in Taiwan, Japan and Italy.

References

External links 
 

1971 births
Olympic baseball players of Australia
Australian baseball players
Baseball players at the 1996 Summer Olympics
Living people
Sportspeople from Perth, Western Australia
Perth Heat players
Baseball people from Western Australia
Taipei Gida players
Parma Baseball Club players